Musica (Latin), or La Musica (Italian) or Música (Portuguese and Spanish) may refer to:

Music

Albums
 Musica è, a mini album by Italian funk singer Eros Ramazzotti 1988
 Musica, an album by Ghaleb 2005
 ), a German album by Giovanni 2008
 , an album by Paolo Meneguzzi 2007
 Musica, an album by Pepito Bueno and Badal Roy 2000
 Musica, an album by WalFredo Vargas 2001
 Musica, an album by Paulinho da Viola 2005
 , a Spanish album by Mocedades 1900

Songs
 "Musica", an Italian song by Air 2003
 "Música", a Spanish song by Al Bano, 1968
 "Musica", an Italian song by Angelo Branduardi 1981
 , a song by Gemelli Diversi 2000
 "Música", a song by Il Divo on Siempre 2006
 "Musica", an English song by Fantastique, 1982
 , an English-language single by Fly Project 2012
 "Musica", a French song by Pierre Kartner 1984
 "Música", a Spanish song by Lucerito, 1985
 , 2007
 "Musica", an Italian song by Mina from album Kyrie, Vol. 1
 "Musica", an Italian song by New Trolls, Belleno, D'Adamo, Di Palo, Belloni, De Scalzi 1980
 "Música", a Spanish song by Pérez Prado
 "Musica", an Italian song by Stefano Ruffini, 1989
 "Música", a Spanish song by Paloma San Basilio
 "La Musica", a French song written by Patrick Juvet 1973

Other uses in music
 Musica (company), a Scandinavian record label
 Musica (French music festival), a music festival Strasbourg
 Musica (retailer), a South African music and film DVD retailer.
 , a Japanese music magazine
 Musica Records, a jazz record label
 Musica Studio's, an Indonesian music company
 La Musica (music festival), Sarasota, Florida

Other
 Musica (sculpture), a 2003 sculpture by Alan LeQuire
 Musica universalis, an ancient philosophical concept
 Phillip Musica (1877–1938), Italian swindler
 La Musica (film), a 1967 film directed by Marguerite Duras
 La Musica, a 1965 play by Marguerite Duras
 La Musica, a character in the opera L'Orfeo
 , a 1926 sculpture by Wäinö Aaltonen
 18 Delphini, a star named Musica
 MSC Musica, a cruise ship

See also
Music (disambiguation)
Musical (disambiguation)